The Namibia toured Ireland from 28 June to 9 September 2011. The tour consisted of one ICC Intercontinental Cup match and a pair of List A matches.

Intercontinental Cup

Intercontinental Cup One-Day

1st List A

2nd List A

2011 in Namibian sport
2011 in Irish cricket
International cricket competitions in 2011